Kattipparuthi  is a census town in Malappuram district in the state of Kerala, India. It is a part of Valanchery municipality.

Demographics
 India census, Kattipparuthi had a population of 35795 with 17490 males and 18305 females.

Transportation
Kattipparuthi village connects to other parts of India through Kuttippuram town.  National highway No.66 passes through Edappal and the northern stretch connects to Goa and Mumbai.  The southern stretch connects to Cochin and Trivandrum.   National Highway No.966 connects to Palakkad and Coimbatore.  The nearest airport is at Kozhikode.  The nearest major railway station is at Kuttippuram.

References

Villages in Malappuram district
Kuttippuram area